The Pink Phink is a 1964 American animated short comedy film directed by Friz Freleng. It is the first animated short starring the Pink Panther. The short won the Academy Award for Best Animated Short at the 37th Academy Awards.

Plot
The Pink Panther and an unnamed painter (known as the "Little Man") compete over whether a house should be painted blue or pink. Each time the painter attempts to paint something blue, the panther thwarts him in a new way, and paints the object/area pink. At the end, the exasperated painter inadvertently turns the house and everything around it pink (first by repeatedly shooting at the elusive panther with a shotgun that the panther had poured pink paint into, and then by burying the panther's pink paint cans in the soil outside the house, where they "sprout" and grow pink grass and trees), and the panther moves in. But just before he moves in, he paints the white man completely pink. The painter bangs his head against the mailbox outside in frustration as the Pink Panther then walks into the house as the sun (also turned pink) sets and the cartoon fades out.

Academy Award
The Pink Phink was the first Pink Panther animated short produced by DePatie–Freleng Enterprises and by winning the 1964 Academy Award for Animated Short Film, it marked the first time that a studio won an Academy Award with its first animated short. It is also both the only animated Pink Panther short and the only installment in the franchise to win the award.

Credits
 "The Pink Panther Theme": Henry Mancini
 Produced by: David H. DePatie, Friz Freleng
 Directed by: Friz Freleng
 Executive Producer: Walter Mirisch
 Co-Director: Hawley Pratt
 Story by: John W. Dunn
 Animation: Don Williams, Bob Matz, Norman McCabe, LaVerne Harding.
 Layout: Dick Ung (uncredited)
 Backgrounds: Tom O'Loughlin
 Film Editor: Lee Gunther
 Camera Operator: John Burton, Jr.
 Production Supervisor: Bill Orcutt
 Music Score: William Lava

Laugh track
A laugh track was added to the theatrical Pink Panther cartoons when they were broadcast as part of the Pink Panther Show aired on NBC, and this laugh track still appears when the show is aired on the Spanish language Boomerang TV channel, and the France Channel Gulli. Most American broadcasts currently air minus the laugh track. The Pink Phink can be viewed in its original form with full titles and sans laugh track on The Official Pink Panther channel on YouTube along with the MGM Television logo.

Popular culture
 An episode of the animated series Dexter's Laboratory entitled "A Silent Cartoon" is a homage to this short; the short features Dexter (filling the role of the painter) trying to construct a blue laboratory, while an all-pink version of his sister Dee Dee finds clever ways to turn the blue lab into a completely pink lab.
 In the 2010 series Pink Panther and Pals, a scene from "A Pinker Tomorrow" in which the Pink Panther tricks the Little Man (Big Nose) to cover the outside of the house in paint, is a homage to the original short, but in a futuristic environment.

See also
 List of American films of 1963
 List of The Pink Panther cartoons

References

External links
 
 

1964 films
1964 animated films
1960s American animated films
1960s animated short films
Best Animated Short Academy Award winners
Short films directed by Friz Freleng
The Pink Panther (cartoons) animated shorts
Films scored by William Lava
DePatie–Freleng Enterprises short films
American animated short films
Films scored by Henry Mancini
Animated films about cats
Animated films without speech